Mariada Pieridi (born 13 July 1973) is a Cypriot pop singer.

Early life
Mariada Pieridi was born in Nicosia, Cyprus. Her father was an officer in the Greek Navy and her mother was a lawyer in Cyprus. She has a younger brother, Dimitri.

Pieridi and her family moved to Athens when she was a child. She soon began to experiment with music and sports. She was on the Pan-Hellenic Gymnastics Association (PGS) for nine years and started playing the piano. Music became an integral part of her life and when she reached high school, she decided that she wanted a career in the music industry. She then took speech classes at the Attica Conservatory and continued with piano lessons.

Career

1995: Eurovision

Pieridi got her first real break into the music industry during the 1995 Eurovision Song Contest in Dublin, Ireland. She was the backing vocalist of the Greek entry to the contest performed by Elina Konstantopoulou. They sang the song "Pia Prosefhi" ("What Kind Of A Prayer"). After Eurovision, Pieridi performed with many popular singers including Despina Vandi, Antonis Remos, Kaiti Garbi and Yiannis Parios, getting her name and voice known.

2002–present

In June 2002, Pieridi released her first album, I Gineka Tis Zois Sou ("The Woman of Your Life"), which was a success and moved her into the mainstream. Also in 2002, at the Arion Music Awards she received the award for "Best New Artist". July 2003 marked the release of Pieridi's first single, "Oute Ki Esi" ("Neither You"), and the album Vale Fantasia (Use Your Imagination) was released three months later in October. Over the following years, she went on to release two more albums,  Abra Katabra and Sfera Stin Kardia (Bullet In The Heart).

In September 2006, she returned with the single "DJ". It is a remake of Swedish singer Carola Häggkvist's "Stanna Eller Ga". The lyrics of all of the songs on the CD are signed off for the first time by Pieridi herself. A few days after the release of the single, Pieridi released her first "best of" album, DJ - The Hits Collection. In mid-December 2008, she released her fifth studio album, Se Prokalo, nine songs, including the single "Milia Makria".

Discography

Albums
2002: I Gineka Tis Zois Sou
2003: Vale Fantasia
2004: Abra Katabra
2005: Sfera Stin Kardia
2006: DJ - The Hits Collection
2008: Se Prokalo

Digital Songs
2009: Fantasia thelei mono (DJ Krazy Kon feat Mariada Pieridi)
2010: Pathima Mathima

Singles
2003: "Oute Ki Esi"
2006: "DJ"
2008: "Tha Doso Resta"

References

External links
Official Website

1973 births
Living people
Arion Music Awards winners
Cypriot emigrants to Greece
Greek laïko singers
21st-century Greek women singers
People from Nicosia
Singers from Athens
Universal Music Greece artists
Virus Music artists